Bobby Henon is an American politician. He was a Democratic member of the Philadelphia City Council from 2012 until 2022.

Political career
Henon, an electrician by trade, has worked as a steward, sub-foreman and foreman. The head of the local chapter of the International Brotherhood of Electrical Workers (IBEW), Johnny Dougherty, eventually named him the chapter's new Political Director, a position from which Henon lobbied various levels of government on legislative issues pertaining to the electrical industry. Henon also managed election day operations for endorsed candidates, educated campaign volunteers, and coordinated major campaign events. He also served as Chairman of the local’s Political Action Committee, as board member of the Electrical Mechanical Association, and as a delegate to the IBEW International Convention.

In 2011, he was elected to Philadelphia City Council's Sixth District, succeeding the retiring incumbent Democrat Joan Krajewski. Since taking office, Henon has focused on quality of life issues in the 6th District through his Bad Neighbor Initiative, which aims to identify the residents and owners of properties who have received multiple property maintenance code violation notices for ongoing issues like trash; over-grown weeds; high grass; and broken windows, which cause property values to drop, neighborhoods to decline and community morale to fade.  The 'worst of the worst' owners are issued subpoenas to testify in front of City Council.

Henon also developed and released the City Hall app, a Philadelphia first-of-its-kind way for residents to interact with City government to report issues from problem properties to potholes.

Manufacturing was also a key focus during Henon's first term. At his urging, Mayor Michael Nutter named a Manufacturing Task Force, of which Henon was named co-chair. The task force was charged with studying the current manufacturing sector and making comprehensive recommendations on how it can grow in the Philadelphia region. The pursuit grew from his strong family ties to manufacturing and belief in bringing family-sustaining jobs back to Philadelphia's neighborhoods.

Family health and physical activity was another key focus for Henon in 2013, when he launched his Philly Play! initiative, which aimed at promoting play and physical activity as  a preventative health measure to families. Central to that effort is the promotion of public play spaces such as recreation centers, basketball courts and other outdoor and indoor play areas, such as Police Athletic League centers.

Criminal charges
In January 2019, Henon was indicted along with other members of the IBEW Local 98, including its business manager Johnny Dougherty, for embezzlement and theft in a corruption probe by federal officials. Henon stated that he planned to contest the charges and not resign from office. On November 15, 2021, Henon was found guilty on 10 of 18 federal charges. On January 20, 2022, Henon resigned from Philadelphia City Council. On March 1, 2023, he was sentenced to 3.5 years in prison, and will report to prison on April 17.

Personal life
Henon and his wife, Jill, live in Northeast Philadelphia with their two sons.

See also
List of members of Philadelphia City Council since 1952

References

External links
Official city council page
Official campaign website

Political activists from Pennsylvania
Living people
International Brotherhood of Electrical Workers people
Philadelphia City Council members
Pennsylvania Democrats
Pennsylvania politicians convicted of crimes
Pennsylvania politicians convicted of corruption
1967 births
American electricians